, short for , is a Japanese light novel series written by Yomi Hirasaka, illustrated by Buriki, and published by Media Factory. It has been given several manga adaptations; the first incarnation, its title and basic plot unchanged, began serialization in 2010; it was written and illustrated by Itachi and published in Monthly Comic Alive. A retelling of the series, written by Misaki Harukawa and illustrated by Shuichi Taguchi and called Boku wa Tomodachi ga Sukunai+ was published in Jump SQ.19. A 12-episode anime adaptation by AIC Build aired in Japan between October and December 2011. An original video animation episode was released in September 2012. A second anime season, Haganai NEXT, aired between January and March 2013. A live-action film adaptation was released in February 2014.

Conception
In developing Boku wa Tomodachi ga Sukunai, or Haganai for short, Hirasaka contrasts the main characters as opposites of the ones in the Light Novel Club which had good relationships to begin with. Hirasaka drew influences from personal experience: "This novel is a story about myself who also had few friends, bad communication skills, negative thinking, lacking life experiences and useless delusional habits." Hirasaka also considers the setting of the stories to be less restrictive.
The anime was directed by Hisashi Saito, who had previously directed the fan service romantic comedy Heaven's Lost Property. Hirasaka noted that Itachi's portrayal of the characters in the manga are "all so cute" and "their faces are full of life", especially the expressions of the heroines Yozora and Sena.

Plot
Kodaka Hasegawa, a transfer student to St. Chronica's Academy, has found it difficult to make friends because of his mix of brown-blond hair (inherited from his deceased English mother) and fierce-looking eyes that make him look like a delinquent. One day, he accidentally comes across the equally solitary and very abrasive Yozora Mikazuki as she converses with "Tomo", her "air" (imaginary) friend. Other students with various backgrounds join the club: Sena Kashiwazaki is an attractive but arrogant idol who has no female friends and treats the boys as her slaves; Yukimura Kusunoki is an effeminate underclassman who idolizes Kodaka and strives to become manly like him; Rika Shiguma is a genius scientist with a perverted mind; Kobato Hasegawa is Kodaka's little sister who generally cosplays as a vampire; and Maria Takayama, a ten-year-old foul-mouthed nun who serves as the club's advisor. The story follows their adventures as the club tries out various school and outside social activities as practice for making friends.

Characters

Neighbors Club
  is the viewpoint character of the light novels; he is a transfer student who has been unable to make friends in his first month at St. Chronica's. He and Yozora Mikazuki start the Neighbors Club with the purpose of learning how to make friends and how to act in social situations. He has a gentle and balanced personality; but his unusual spotty-blond hair color, inherited from his late English mother, leads classmates to assume he is a violent and abusive delinquent and to spread defamatory rumors about him. Because of his reputation, Kodaka has become accustomed to conflicts and having to defend himself. Prior to the series, Kodaka often had to move because of his father's work as an archeologist. He has few memories related to home life, and no friends besides a single childhood friend from ten years previous, whose name eludes him at first. He later discovers that his friend 'Sora', whom he thought to be a boy, is in fact Yozora. He does not show any romantic intentions towards anyone in the club until Sena's confession, which prompts him to reveal that he has been in love with her since their first meeting. Correction: In LN 12 Chapter 51-53, Kodaka/Sena's father is under the impression that Kodaka and Sena are in a relationship and asks how they are progressing, and Kodaka seriously denies this in front of the group. Sena explains to Kodaka in private that she may have misled her father by exclaiming that with the Wonderland tickets she will be able to make Kobato her younger sister, and also tells Kodaka that their fathers betrothed them before they were old enough to remember. It was "a formal contract with their thumbprints and everything". They both smile. Kodaka then says his dad probably doesn't remember, because he wasn't told any of this, and it doesn't matter anymore because "that was when we were kids". Neither confess. When Sena and Kodaka return to the group, they try to keep a low profile but are eventually confronted with the question whether they are engaged. They do not respond, but Yozora is already questioning Rika which is closer - childhood friends or a betrothed couple. Kodaka thinks to himself that this is too cruel to Yozora. They both then say the engagement doesn't matter and to get back to the club's activity - filming. Kodaka is voiced by Ryōhei Kimura, and by Jerry Jewell in English. For the live-action film, he is portrayed by Kōji Seto.
  is a black-haired girl who is described as not having much going for her other than her looks. She is a gifted student who often argues with Sena, who consistently scores better than she does on their exams. Yozora is verbally abusive towards people in general, not to mention the other members of the Neighbors Club, especially Yukimura, whom she fools into working for the club as a crossdressing cosplay maid. Ten years prior to the start of the series, she and Kodaka ("Taka") were childhood friends, but because she had short hair and wore a cap, Taka mistook her for a boy and called her "Sora". The day before he moved away, she wore a skirt to reveal the fact that she was a girl, but was too embarrassed to meet with him. Kodaka was going to tell her of his imminent departure at the meeting, but since it did not happen, it appeared to Yozora that she had been abandoned, thus exacerbating her distrust of others. At the start of the series, she recognizes Kodaka as her childhood friend. When Kodaka discovers her talking to her imaginary friend "Tomo-chan", she creates the Neighbors Club in order to renew their friendship. Kodaka does not recognize her as Sora until later in the story after she cuts her hair short. In the anime, Yozora is voiced by Marina Inoue in Japanese and by Whitney Rodgers in English. In the live-action film, she is portrayed by Kie Kitano.
  is a blonde-haired girl who is described as "perfect in every way except for her personality." The daughter of the school's chairman, Sena shows a dislike of all things "ordinary". She is both attractive and academically successful, but her arrogance precludes her from making female friends, and she treats her male classmates as slaves. She enjoys playing video games, particularly bishoujo (games where the main character tries to win over a girl) because they allow her to make female (if virtual) friends, although some of the games have embarrassing adult content. She does not get along with Yozora, who calls her , Although she originally joins the Neighbors Club to learn how to make friends, she develops feelings for Kodaka after he scolds her for inciting an incident during their trip to the swimming pool. When it is revealed that, fourteen years previously, her father arranged a marriage between her and Kodaka (his best friend's son), Sena confesses her feelings and proposes to Kodaka. In the anime, Sena is voiced by Kanae Itō in Japanese and by Jad Saxton in English. In the live-action film, she is portrayed by Mio Otani.
  is a junior high student at St. Chronica's Academy. She is very close to her older brother Kodaka, and behaves in a jealous and clingy way whenever he does not give her attention. Kobato cosplays as "Reisys V. Felicity Sumeragi", an ancient vampire, her favourite character from the anime Iron Necromancer, by wearing gothic clothing and a red contact lens, drinking tomato juice (blood) and speaking in affected formal language, although Kodaka still treats her as a little sister by making her eat her vegetables and take a bath. When she gets emotionally worked up, she reverts to a strong Kyūshū accent. She joins the Neighbors Club to spend more time with Kodaka, and develops a rivalry with Maria, who is closest to her in age. When the club visit her school's festival to watch her class film, it is revealed that she is quite popular, but has refused to make friends with her classmates despite their efforts to befriend her. In the anime, Kobato is voiced by Kana Hanazawa in Japanese and by Alison Viktorin in English. In the live-action film, she is portrayed by Sayu Kubota.
  is an effeminate schoolmate who is first introduced as Kodaka's stalker. A gullible student with low self-esteem, Yukimura believes Kodaka to be a romantic and masculine outlaw who lives life the way he wants to, and eagerly pledges to become his "underling" in order to learn how to become manlier. Despite claiming to be a boy, Yukimura dresses in girls' clothes, as he takes to heart Yozora's flippant comments about masculinity and clothing. Later in the story, Kodaka discovers that Yukimura is actually a girl, even to Yukimura's own surprise.} In the anime, Yukimura is voiced by Nozomi Yamamoto in Japanese and by Ashleigh Domangue in English. In the live-action film, Yukimura is portrayed by Sara Takatsuki, who has worked on live-action adaptations of Great Teacher Onizuka and Daily Lives of High School Boys.
  is a first-year genius-scientist student whom the school has given a special research room and excused from attending classes. She is an illeist who always addresses herself in third person, never in first person. She becomes interested in Kodaka after he rescues her from the lab after one of her experiments goes disastrously wrong. Although she wears glasses and seems serious, she is the most eccentric and sexually forward club member, and often converts innocent remarks into something perverted. She enjoys reading BL (boys' love) dōjinshi (self-published magazines), and is especially aroused by stories that involve intercourse between mecha. In the anime, Rika is voiced by Misato Fukuen in Japanese and by Alexis Tipton in English. For the live-action film, Rika is portrayed by Mao Kanjō.
  is a ten-year-old nun and the club's staff adviser. She is very rude and immature, and often uses a variety of expletives when annoyed. After Kodaka starts making her packed lunches, she becomes very affectionate with her new-found onii-chan (big brother), much to Kobato's annoyance. She is easily manipulated by Yozora, who gets her to perform menial tasks by framing them as things adults would do. Volume 8 of the light novels has a story where her teaching position is challenged. In the anime series, Maria is voiced by Yuka Iguchi in Japanese and by Kristi Kang in English. For the live-action film, Momoka Yamada portrays Maria.

Supporting characters
  is Sena's father and the president of St. Chronica's. As a friend of Kodaka's father, he arranges for Kodaka and Kobato to attend the school. He is embarrassed by the unusual pronunciation of his first name, which would normally be "Tenma". He often badmouths Kodaka's father, but only because he truly values him as his best (and more or less only) friend. He seems intent to betroth Sena to Kodaka, often saying that he considers Kodaka to be "a man I can entrust Sena to", after misunderstanding Sena's intentions to make Kobato her younger sister. In the anime series, he is voiced by Ryōtarō Okiayu in Japanese and by Brandon Potter in English.
  is the Kashiwazaki family butler and Sena's older half-sister. A blonde 22-year-old woman, she is a capable servant, though often surprisingly outspoken to her employer. She has a habit of making straight-faced jokes. In the anime series, Stella is voiced by Ryōka Yuzuki in Japanese and by Caitlin Glass in English.
  is Maria's older sister who meets Kodaka and expresses her gratitude to him and the Neighbors Club for taking care of Maria and keeping Maria's ego in check. She has a largely nonchalant attitude, and sometimes inappropriately belches or farts in public. Despite being relatively mature, she eventually calls Kodaka onii-chan (big brother) as well, since she is only 15 years old. In the English version of the manga, she goes by Keito. In the anime series, she is voiced by Emiri Katō in Japanese and by Brina Palencia in English.
  is the student body treasurer at St. Chronica's. She is Sena's classmate and ranked second in the year-end exam. She competes with Sena in her studies and is also envious of her popularity and other excellent attributes. She also attempted to disband the Neighbors Club twice due to the club's lax performance and unmet requirements, but failed nonetheless after being faced with Yozora's and Sena's harsh scolding. She is first introduced in second season of the anime series, and is voiced by Mariya Ise in Japanese and by Felecia Angelle in English.
  is the student council president in the anime series. She is very popular in school, having been elected twice, and is an athlete who helps out in all the sports clubs.. It is later revealed she is Yozora's older sister. She is voiced by Yōko Hikasa in Japanese and by Brittney Karbowski in English.
  is Kodaka and Kobato's father. He is a renowned archaeologist. He is voiced by Katsuyuki Konishi in Japanese and by Bill Jenkins in English.
  is the cold-hearted student council president who is an exclusive character to the live-action film adaptation. He is portrayed by Louis Kurihara.

Media

Light novels
The original light novel series, written by Yomi Hirasaka and illustrated by Buriki, began publication on Media Factory's MF Bunko J imprint from August 31, 2009 to August 25, 2015. Eleven volumes in the series have been published. Hirasaka and Buriki also released the light novel Boku wa Tomodachi ga Sukunai Connect in December 2012.
 is a series of anthology stories by various guest authors, including Yomi Hirasaka, Yūji Yūji, Wataru Watari, Yū Shimizu, Sō Sagara, Asaura, Hajime Asano, Ryō Iwanami, Shirō Shiratori, Takaya Kagami and guest illustrators Buriki, Kantoku, Ruroo, Peco, QP:flapper, Miyama-Zero, Shunsaku Tomose, Yuu Kamiya, Koin, Ponkan8, Hanpen Sakura.

Two volumes of the spin-off Boku wa Tomodachi ga Sukunai Universe were published on November 23, 2011, and February 22, 2013.

Manga
The first Boku wa Tomodachi ga Sukunai manga series, written and illustrated by Itachi, was published in Media Factory's Monthly Comic Alive magazine from its May 2010 issue, released on March 27, 2010, to February 2021 issue, released on December 27, 2020. The series has been collected in twenty tankōbon volumes. Seven Seas Entertainment has licensed the first manga series in North America under the title Haganai: I Don't Have Many Friends and released it between 2012 and 2022.

A remade manga series, written by Misaki Harukawa and illustrated by Shouichi Taguchi, was published in Shueisha's Jump SQ.19 from November 19, 2010 to June 19, 2012. Plus introduces the characters in a different order and goes through different adventures. The series was collected in two volumes, which were published on October 4, 2011 and August 3, 2012.

Three volumes of short stories, titled , have been published by Media Factory since October 22, 2011. Each chapter of them is written and illustrated by different authors.

The series of one-shot stories  written by Chiruwo Kazehana and illustrated by Shirabii; and  written by Kiurian and illustrated by Bomi, were serialized in Comic Alive in 2011–2012 and 2012–2013 respectively. Both series have been licensed in English by Seven Seas Entertainment; and released on July 1, 2014 and December 16, 2014, respectively.

In the English manga, each chapter is numbered as a Club Activity Log. Translation was done by Ryan Peterson, and adaptation was done by Ysabet Reinhardt MacFarlane.

Anime

In May 2011, an anime television series based on the light novels was announced on the wraparound jacket of the sixth light novel,  with an original video animation bundled with the seventh light novel released on September 22, 2011. Produced by AIC Build under the direction of Hisashi Saitō, the series aired in Japan from October 7 to December 23, 2011. The anime is based on the first three volumes and the beginning of volume four. The anime was licensed for streaming by Funimation, who hosted the stream on the website and Nico Nico, before licensing the series for home video release.

A follow-up original video animation episode was released on September 26, 2012.

A second season, titled Haganai NEXT, aired from January 11 to March 29, 2013. It is based on the novels from volume four until the first few present in volume nine. The series was directed by Toru Kitahata whilst Hirasaka was in charge of the scripts.

Game
A visual novel, Boku wa Tomodachi ga Sukunai Portable, was developed by Namco Bandai Games for the PlayStation Portable and released on February 23, 2012.

Live-action film
On April 24, 2013, Ryukoku University posted a casting call for extras for a 2014 film adaptation of Haganai, to be distributed by Toei and produced by "I Don't Have Many Friends" Production Committee, consisting of Times-In, Kinoshita Group, Pony Canyon, Toei Video Company, Toei itself, Kadokawa, Dwango and Guild. Hirasaka later confirmed the film's existence on May 2, 2013, stating that, whilst he initially didn't approve of the project, as he didn't feel the story was intended for live-action, he decided to approve it in light of a crisis in the light novel industry. Hirasaka will have a completely hands-off role in the film's production. Takurō Oikawa, the film's director, chose not to watch the anime and told his cast members not to watch it either so that they can present a fresh interpretation of the light novels. The Japanese film site Cinema Cafe began streaming the full trailer for the live-action film light novel series on December 4, 2013. The film was released on February 1, 2014.

Reception
The second volume of the manga adaptation ranked seventh on the top 30 of Japanese Comic Ranking, for the week of May 23–29, 2011.

Rebecca Silverman of Anime News Network found the first graphic novel “fairly entertaining” with artist Itachi's illustrations “between beautiful depictions of the girls and messy sketches, which actually works well for the series”. While the premise “retreads familiar ground”, she noted the girls’ reactions in the dating sim chapter as the highlight of the volume.

Tim Jones of THEM Anime Reviews gave the anime series three of five stars. He grouped the social misfits show as a “raunchy romp filled with lots of cheesecake and hit-or-miss comedy”, with “great leads, okay side characters”, and didn't “need to be reminded every episode how huge Sena’s breasts are, thanks”.

Carl Kimlinger of Anime News Network found the anime series interesting in that it starts with misfits finding friends and deferred the typical romantic comedy entanglements but was deflated that the series was “taking on harem baggage.” The second half of series was "increasingly formulaic" and left him longing for a story. He found the episodes to have very little novelty: "Relationships change little, characters evolve not at all, and the message—that these outcasts have already found their friends and just refuse to acknowledge it—remains the same. We might as well be watching the first couple of episodes repeat ad infinitum." Bamboo Dong found the series' strength to be in the character development, but its drawback was that such moments are far and few compared to the "recycled referential humor, like drawing the characters inside a video game, or drawing them inside a dating sim", and the same "bland paste of old jokes". She preferred the English dub as the characters insulting each other was better than the dull name-calling in Japanese.

Andy Hanley of UK Anime.net gave the anime series a 6/10, and called the anime a series of two halves, where the first half contained “great and hugely funny episodes” but the second half was “increasingly tired and even unlikeable” where “sure-fire comedy concepts such as a visit to karaoke or the swimming pool fail to do anything noteworthy with their subject material.” He found that the main characters undermined the series later on with “Yozora's snarky, bossy attitude which works so well in early episodes turns to bitchiness and then downright bullying” as Sena's obsessions to “become something of a dead horse which the series insists upon flogging.” He later gave the first graphic novel a 4/10. With Yozora and Sena as "massive bitches" more so than in the anime, he wrote that "a better title for the series might be It's Probably For The Best That You Have No Friends."  He found the Seven Seas translation to be balanced and that its presentation was without complaint.

See also
 A Sister's All You Need - a light novel series by the same author

Explanatory notes

Notes about works cited 
  "LN" is shortened form for light novel and refers to a volume number of the Haganai light novels.
  "Ch." is a shortened form for "chapter" and refers to a chapter number of the Haganai manga.

References

External links 

 Official manga website 
 Official anime website 
 

2009 Japanese novels
2012 anime OVAs
2012 video games
2013 anime television series debuts
Anime International Company
Anime and manga based on light novels
Bandai Namco games
Films based on light novels
Funimation
Harem anime and manga
Harem video games
Japan-exclusive video games
Japanese romantic comedy films
Kadokawa Dwango franchises
Light novels
MF Bunko J
Mainichi Broadcasting System original programming
Media Factory manga
PlayStation Portable games
PlayStation Portable-only games
Seinen manga
Seven Seas Entertainment titles
Shueisha manga
Shōnen manga
TBS Television (Japan) original programming
Video games based on anime and manga
Video games developed in Japan
Visual novels